Fatima Aouam (December 16, 1959 – December 27, 2014) was a Moroccan middle distance runner from Settat Guisser. She is best known for twice winning the gold medal at the 1987 Mediterranean Games in Latakia, Syria. Aouam set her personal best (4:05.49) in the 1,500 m in 1986. She died at the age of 55 in 2014.

Achievements

References

External links

1959 births
2014 deaths
Moroccan female middle-distance runners
Athletes (track and field) at the 1988 Summer Olympics
Olympic athletes of Morocco
World Athletics Championships athletes for Morocco
Mediterranean Games gold medalists for Morocco
Mediterranean Games medalists in athletics
Athletes (track and field) at the 1987 Mediterranean Games